The following lists events that happened during 2015 in the Central African Republic.

Incumbents
 President: Catherine Samba-Panza (acting) 
 Prime Minister: Mahamat Kamoun (acting)

Events

January–June
 January 6 - A man claiming to be the Lord's Resistance Army top commander Ugandan Dominic Ongwen turns himself in to United States forces in the Central African Republic.

July–December
 September 25-October 1 - Sectarian violence as a part of the Central African Republic Civil War kill 31.
 November 29, 2015 - Pope Francis visits the Republic, pleading to not give into “the temptation of fear of others, of the unfamiliar, of what is not part of our ethnic group, our political views or our religious confession”.
 December 30, 2015 - The first elections take place after the Seleka seized power in 2013.

References

 
Years of the 21st century in the Central African Republic
2010s in the Central African Republic
Central African Republic
Central African Republic